Drumhawnagh (Drumhowna) Railway Station near Loughduff in County Cavan, Ireland was a former station on the Inny Junction to Cavan branch of the Midland Great Western Railway, Ireland. It opened in 1877 and closed in 1947.  The previous station along the dismantled branch was Ballywillan whereas the next station along the dismantled branch to Cavan is Crossdoney.

See also
List of closed railway stations in Ireland

References 

Ordnance Survey of Ireland Discovery Series 1:50,000 map no. 34 shows the station locale.

Disused railway stations in County Cavan
Railway stations opened in 1856
Railway stations closed in 1960